I cannibali (also released as The Year of the Cannibals) is 1970 Italian drama film directed by Liliana Cavani and starring Britt Ekland, Pierre Clémenti, and Tomas Milian. It is a modernized retelling of the Greek tragedy Antigone, set in contemporary Milan and drawing upon socio-political themes and imagery of the time, including the protests of 1968, the counter-cultural movement, and the Years of Lead. The film competed in the Directors' Fortnight section of the 23rd Cannes Film Festival.

Cast

Re-release
A restored version of the movie was released on DVD and Blu-ray by Kino Lorber in 2014.

Soundtrack
A complete limited edition of the soundtrack has been released on vinyl by Spikerot Records in 2019.

References

External links

 

1970 films
Italian drama films
Films based on works by Sophocles
Films directed by Liliana Cavani
Films scored by Ennio Morricone
1970 drama films
Modern adaptations of Antigone (Sophocles play)
Italian political films
1970s Italian-language films
1970s Italian films